Lysicles ( Lysikles; died 338 BC), one of the commanders of the Athenian army at the battle of Chaeronea, 338 BC, was subsequently condemned to death, upon the accusation of the orator Lycurgus. The speech which Lycurgus delivered against Lysicles is referred to by Harpocration.

Notes

References
 Smith, William (editor); Dictionary of Greek and Roman Biography and Mythology, "Lysicles (2)", Boston, (1867)
 

338 BC deaths
4th-century BC Greek people
Ancient Athenian generals
Year of birth unknown